Chenneerkara  is a village in Pathanamthitta district in the state of Kerala, India. The majority of its inhabitants are from Hindu and Christian backgrounds. The primary crops are rubber, coconut, black pepper and plantain. Chenneerkara is 10 km from Pathanamthitta and 7.5 km from Pandalam.

Demographics

As of 2011 India census, Chenneerkara had a population of 19124 with 8882 males and 10242 females.

Educational Institutions
SNDP Higher Secondary School
Shalom Public School
Government ITI, Chenneerkara
Kendriya Vidyalaya Chenneerkara
 Government Higher Secondary School, Thumpamon North
Govt UPS Erathumpamon

Religious Centres
 Kunnel devi Kshethram
 Mathoorkavu Bhagavathi Kshethram
St. Mary's Catholic Church
Sree Narayana Giri Mahadeva Kshethram
St, Thomas CSI Church
Valiyatharayil Siva Kshethram
Ebenezer Mar Thoma Church
Indian Pentecostal Church of God
Church of God (full Gospel) in India
The Pentecostal Mission 
Manjinikkara Dayara - Pilgrim Centre
St. George Orthodox Church, Mathoor
Mar Barsouma Orthodox Church, Panackal
St.George Orthodox Church, Oonnukal
Little Flower Catholic Church, Oonnukal
St. Marys Orthodox Church, Prakkanam
St. Mary's Orthodox Church, Thottupuram
St. Paul's CSI Church, Nallanikunnu
St.Johns CSI Church, Erathumpamon

References

Villages in Pathanamthitta district